Cebrio is a genus of beetle of the subfamily Elaterinae from the family of click beetles.

Species 
According to Fauna Europaea, the following species are accepted within Cebrio:

 Cebrio amori
 Cebrio andalusicus
 Cebrio angusticornis
 Cebrio antennatus
 Cebrio anthracinus
 Cebrio apicalis
 Cebrio benedicti
 Cebrio brevicornis
 Cebrio bruleirei
 Cebrio cantabricus
 Cebrio carbonarius
 Cebrio carrenii
 Cebrio cordubensis
 Cebrio corsicus
 Cebrio dufouri
 Cebrio elenacompteae
 Cebrio fabricii
 Cebrio fiorii
 Cebrio fossulatus
 Cebrio frater
 Cebrio fuscatus
 Cebrio germari
 Cebrio getschmanni
 Cebrio gigas
 Cebrio gypsicola
 Cebrio impresicollis
 Cebrio insignitus
 Cebrio insularis
 Cebrio maculicollis
 Cebrio malaccensis
 Cebrio melanocephalus
 Cebrio morio
 Cebrio moyses
 Cebrio neapolitanus
 Cebrio nigricornis
 Cebrio parvicollis
 Cebrio personatus
 Cebrio puberulus
 Cebrio pubicornis
 Cebrio rozasi
 Cebrio rubicundus
 Cebrio ruficollis
 Cebrio rufifrons
 Cebrio sardous
 Cebrio seguranus
 Cebrio seoanei
 Cebrio strictus
 Cebrio superbus
 Cebrio suturalis
 Cebrio tarifensis
 Cebrio testaceus
 Cebrio tricolor
 Cebrio ysernii

References 

Elateridae
Beetles described in 1787